Claves Records is a Swiss classical record label, which was founded in 1968 by Marguerite Dütschler-Hüber (1931–2006) in Thun.

History 
Marguerite Dütschler-Hüber founded Claves with business partner Ursula Pfaehler when her piano teacher Jörg Ewald Dähler was unable to find a company willing to record and issue an LP of Bach preludes. The label specialised in Swiss music and artists such as flutist Peter-Lukas Graf and Lieder recitals by performers including Dietrich Fischer-Dieskau, Teresa Berganza and Ernst Haefliger. Claves also launched the recording career of María Bayo.

Claves Records SA was formally founded in 1968. In 2004, the label was acquired by the Clara Haskil foundation and then by Olivier Verrey who runs the company with other board members. Its first managing director was Antonin Scherrer who was succeeded by Thierry Scherz, In 2010 Patrick Peikert succeeded Scherz as managing director.

Claves Records is now located in Prilly, Switzerland.

Orchestras 
 Chamber Orchestra Kremlin
 Chamber Orchestra Tibor Varga
 City Of Birmingham Symphony Orchestra
 English Chamber Orchestra
 Euskadiko Orkestra Sinfonikoa (Basque National Orchestra)
 Orchestra Mozart
 Orchestre de Chambre de Genève
 Orchestre de Chambre de Lausanne
 Orchestre Philharmonique De Monte-Carlo
 Orchestre de la Suisse Romande
 Orchestre de l’Opéra de Rouen Normandie
 Orchestre National de Paris
 Prague Philharmonic Orchestra
 Rundfunk-Sinfonieorchester Saarbrücken
 The Ossipov Balalaika Orchestra

Artists 

 Flute & Recorder
 Peter-Lukas Graf (Flute)
 Marina Piccinini (Flute)
 Maurice Steger (Recorder)
 Piano
 Cédric Pescia
 Clara Haskil
 Cristian Budu
 Dmitri Bashkirov
 Finghin Collins
 Fabrizio Chiovetta
 Francesco Piemontesi
 Guillaume Bellom
 Joachim Carr
 Joseph Moog
 Kevin Jansson
 Marc Pantillon
 Massimilian Mainolfi
 Mélodie Zhao
 Michael Studer
 Michel Dalberto
 Paavali Jumppanen
 Ricardo Requejo
 Violin
 Esther Hoppe
 Nurit Stark
 Bianca Favez
 Alexandra Soumm
 Nathan Milstein
 Daniel Röhn
 Corey Cerovsek
 Mark Kaplan
 Tibor Varga
 Christian Ferras
 Claude Starck
 Duilio Galfetti
 Ettore Causa
 Ingolf Turban
 Lisa Schatzman
 Organ & Harpischord
 Ursula Dütscher (Fortepiano & Harpsichord)
 Benjamin Righetti (Organ)
 Kei Koito (Organ)
 Jörg Ewald Dähler (Haprischord)
 Vocal
 Teresa Berganza (Soprano)
 Stephan Genz (Baryton)
 Brigitte Balleys
 Dietrich Fischer-Dieskau
 Eric Tappy
 Ernst Haefliger
 Gérard Souzay
 Gwyneth Jones
 Herman Wallén
 Jean-Marie Auberson
 María Bayo
 Maria Riccarda Wesseling
 Martin Homrich
 Norah Amsellem
 Ramón Vargas
 Roberto E Dimitri (Clown Dimitri)
 Harp
 Anaïs Gaudemard
 Xavier de Maistre
 Ursula Holliger
 Cello
 Nicolas Altstaedt
 Astrig Siranossian
 Mattia Zappa
 Oboe
 Ingo Goritzki
 Omar Zoboli
 Ensembles, Duos & Trios
 Duo Crommelynck (Piano 4 Hands)
 Charl du Plessis Trio (Piano, Bass & Drums)
 Duo Perlamusica (Piano & Guitar)
 Trio Nota Bene (Piano, Violin & Cello)
 Quatuor Sine Nomine
 Voces Suaves
 Philip Jones Brass Ensemble
 Quatuor Terpsycordes
 Slokar Trombone Quartet
 Conductors
 Heinz Holliger (Conductor & Oboe)
 Lawrence Foster (Conductor)
 Armin Jordan
 Claudio Abbado
 Diego Fasolis
 Emmanuel Krivine
 Ernest Ansermet
 Jesus Lopez-Cobos
 Jörg Ewald Dähler
 Lucas Macías Navarro
 Marcello Viotti
 Peter-Lukas Graf (Conductor & Flute)
 Victor Desarzens
 Michail Jurowski

Collaborations and co-productions 
 Sommets Musicaux de Gstaad
 Clara Haskil International Piano Competition (Concours Clara Haskil)
 Montres Breguet & Concours de Genève (Geneva Competition)
 Lavaux Classic (Cully Classique)
 RTS - Espace2

References

External links

Classical music record labels